Pythion or Pythium, also Pythoion (Πύθοιον) was a city and polis (city-state) of Perrhaebia in ancient Thessaly, situated at the foot of Mount Olympus, and forming a Tripolis with the two neighbouring towns of Azorus and Doliche. Pythion derived its name from a temple of Apollo Pythius situated on one of the summits of Olympus, as we learn from an epigram of Xeinagoras, a Greek mathematician, who measured the height of Olympus from these parts. Games were also celebrated here in honour of Apollo.

Geography
Pythion commanded an important pass across Mount Olympus. This pass and that of Tempe are the only two leading from Macedonia into the northeast of Thessaly.

History
During the reign of Amyntas III or Philip II, the Tripolis  was annexed to Macedon. According to Theagenes the inhabitants of Balla were relocated to Pythion. So we find in 3rd century BC an epigram regarding Philarchos son of Hellanion, Macedonian Elimiote from Pythion, proxenos in Delphi.

During the Roman–Seleucid War, the Tripolis was ravaged by an army of Aetolians in the year 191 BCE During the Third Macedonian War the three towns surrendered to the army of Perseus of Macedon in the year 171 BCE, but that same year the Romans reconquered the three. In the year 169 BCE troops arrived from the Roman consul Quintus Marcius Philippus who camped between Azorus and Doliche.

The three cities minted a common coin with the inscription "ΤΡΙΠΟΛΙΤΑΝ".

Although the site is occupied by a modern town of Pythio, virtually no remains of the ancient town have been discovered there.

References

Cities in ancient Greece
Populated places in ancient Thessaly
Former populated places in Greece
Apollo
Mount Olympus
Macedonian colonies in Thessaly
Perrhaebia
Thessalian city-states